Phoenix is a decentralized network coordinate (NC) system based on the matrix factorization model.

Background 
 Network coordinate (NC) systems are an efficient mechanism for internet distance (round-trip latency) prediction with scalable measurements. For a network with N hosts, by performing O(N) measurements, all N*N distances can be predicted.
 Use cases: Vuze BitTorrent, application layer multicast, PeerWise overlay, multi-player online gaming.
 Triangle inequality violation (TIV) is widely exist on the Internet due to the current sub-optimal internet routing.

Model 
 Most of the prior NC systems use the Euclidean distance model, i.e. embed N hosts into a d-dimensional Euclidean space Rd. Due to the wide existence of TIVs on the internet, the prediction accuracy of such systems is limited. Phoenix uses a matrix factorization (MF) model, which does not have the constraint of TIV.
This matrix factorization is essentially a problem of linear dimensionality reduction and Phoenix tries to solve it in a distributed way.

Design choices in Phoenix 
 Different from the existing MF based NC systems such as IDES and DMF, Phoenix introduces a weight to each reference NC and trusts the NCs with higher weight values more than the others. The weight-based mechanism can substantially reduce the impact of the error propagation.
 For node discovery, Phoenix uses a distributed scheme, so-called peer exchange (PEX), which is used in BitTorrent (protocol). The usage of PEX reduces the load of the tracker, while still ensuring the prediction accuracy under node churn.
 Similar to DMF, for avoiding the potential drift of the NCs, Regularization (mathematics) is introduced in NC calculation.
 NCShield is a decentralized, goosip-based trust and reputation system to secure Phoenix and other matrix factorization-based NC systems.

See also 
 Vivaldi coordinates
 Pharos network coordinates
 Global network positioning
 An open source simulator of Phoenix

References 

Computer networking